Foyil is a town in Rogers County, Oklahoma, United States. It was named for Alfred Foyil, a local landowner and the first postmaster of the town. The population was 344 at the 2010 census, a 47.0 percent increase over the figure of 234 recorded in 2000.

Geography
Foyil is located at  (36.433792, -95.520707). It lies on Oklahoma State Highway 66, formerly U.S. Route 66, just south of its junction with Oklahoma State Highway 28.

Demographics

As of the census of 2000, there were 234 people, 97 households, and 68 families residing in the town. There were 112 housing units at an average density of 314.6 per square mile (120.1/km2). The racial makeup of the town was 79.06% White, 9.40% Native American, 1.71% from other races, and 9.83% from two or more races. Hispanic or Latino of any race were 2.56% of the population.

There were 97 households, out of which 23.7% had children under the age of 18 living with them, 57.7% were married couples living together, 11.3% had a female householder with no husband present, and 28.9% were non-families. 23.7% of all households were made up of individuals, and 12.4% had someone living alone who was 65 years of age or older. The average household size was 2.41 and the average family size was 2.83.

In the town, the population was spread out, with 21.8% under the age of 18, 6.8% from 18 to 24, 22.6% from 25 to 44, 33.3% from 45 to 64, and 15.4% who were 65 years of age or older. The median age was 44 years. For every 100 females, there were 95.0 males. For every 100 females age 18 and over, there were 88.7 males.

The median income for a household in the town was $23,125, and the median income for a family was $28,500. Males had a median income of $27,083 versus $24,107 for females. The per capita income for the town was $11,260. About 31.9% of families and 33.7% of the population were below the poverty line, including 37.7% of those under the age of eighteen and 15.6% of those 65 or over.

References

External links
 Encyclopedia of Oklahoma History and Culture - Foyil

Towns in Rogers County, Oklahoma
Towns in Oklahoma